Richard Kell (born 15 September 1979) is an English former professional footballer who played as a midfielder.

Career 
He made 101 appearances in the Football League for Torquay United, Scunthorpe United, Barnsley and Lincoln City. In June 2005, he signed for Barnsley. He left Barnsley in 2006 and signed for Lincoln in December of that year. Kell left Lincoln City in 2007 as the club decided not to renew his contract.

Personal life 
After retiring from football through injury, where he suffered two double leg fractures, he trained to become a commercial airline pilot.

References

1979 births
Living people
Sportspeople from Bishop Auckland
Footballers from County Durham
English footballers
Association football midfielders
Middlesbrough F.C. players
Torquay United F.C. players
Scunthorpe United F.C. players
Barnsley F.C. players
Scarborough F.C. players
Lincoln City F.C. players
English Football League players
National League (English football) players
Commercial aviators